Mahmoud Kaoud (born August 27, 1988) is an Egyptian professional footballer who currently plays as a central midfielder for the Egyptian club Enppi.

References

External links
Mahmoud Kaoud at FootballDatabase.eu

1988 births
Living people
ENPPI SC players
Asyut Petroleum SC players
El Minya SC players
Egyptian footballers
Association football midfielders